The Boulevard academy is a coeducational secondary school located in Kingston upon Hull in the East Riding of Yorkshire, England.

It opened as a free school in September 2013, and was rated as 'outstanding' by Ofsted in 2015.

References

External links

Secondary schools in Kingston upon Hull
Free schools in Yorkshire
Educational institutions established in 2013
2013 establishments in England